The Griffin's Foods Company is a New Zealand food company currently headquartered in Auckland and established by John Griffin as a flour and cocoa mill in the city of Nelson in 1864. The company started biscuit manufacturing in 1890. Products commercialised by Griffin's include cookies, chocolate confection, crackers, cereal bars, and snack food.

Since 1962, Griffin's has been owned by several companies including Nabisco, Danone, Pacific Equity Partners and Universal Robina. As of 2021, it has been wholly-owned by Intersnack. Griffin's had sales of approximately NZ$300 million in 2011.

History 

The company was founded by English John Griffin (1813–1893) in Nelson, New Zealand in 1869 as a flour and cocoa miller in 1864. Griffin had arrived in Nelson in 1854, commencing business in a bakery shop one year later. After it was severely damaged by an earthquake in 1855, Griffin moved to Christchurch, then returning to Nelson a few years later when conditions improved.

Newspaper records show biscuits were in production by the 1880s and the confectionery arm of the business launched in 1886. By the 1890s Griffins were producing a range of candied peels and by the late 1900s drinking cocoa. Main produce was distributed via the Griffins manufacturing plant on Ashmole Street in Christchurch.

After Griffin died in 1893, his sons J.H. and G.R. Griffin carried out the family business. When in February 1895 a huge fire caused a new disaster, they formed a public company with a capital of £5,172. In search of further capital to expand the business, in 1897 a chocolate factory was acquired. Griffin's expanded, making army ration biscuits during World War II, those where the times of the biscuit industry as a provider of goods for war purposes that helped it become larger than any other industry in New Zealand.

Griffin's opened a new factory in Lower Hutt in 1938, transferring its entire biscuit manufacturing operation there and leaving the Nelson factory entirely to confectionery manufacture.  In 1959, Griffin acquired the Southern Cross Biscuit Factory, a rival company owned by the Dustin family.

In 1962, Griffin was purchased by Nabisco. Griffin bought confectionery manufacturer Sweetacres in 1971. The company also added British Huntley & Palmers' crackers to its brand portfolio, and two years later Griffin acquired "Eta Foods" including its range of snacks and potato chips brands. The Nelson factory was closed by Nabisco in 1988, with the loss of 137 jobs, most of them women's. The former factory was then demolished. In 1989 Griffin's acquired biscuit company Hudsons, taking on the copyright for the famous Hudson's icon Cookie Bear. When Nabisco was effectively broken up, Griffin's was acquired by Britannia Foods in 1990, but in December of the same year Danone bought it from Britannia Foods. 

In 2006 Danone divested Griffin's to Pacific Equity Partners. One year later, Griffin's acquired the "Nice & Natural Wrapped Snacks" company to become the leader snack food manufacturer in New Zealand.

The Lower Hutt plant closed in 2008 with the loss of 200 jobs, with all production transferred to the Auckland sites. In 2009 Griffin's moved the production of its cream filled biscuits, which account for 2.5% of production, to Fiji. 

In July 2014, Pacific Equity Partners divested of Griffin's Foods, selling the operations to Philippine company Universal Robina for NZ$700 million. In October 2015, Universal Robina announced they were expanding the Griffin's brand to the Southeast Asian market starting with the Philippines.

In December 2019, Universal Robina and German company Intersnack formed Unisnack ANZ, a joint venture comprising Griffin's and Snack Brands Australia. Intersnack held a 40% stake in the consolidated business. In August 2021, Universal Robina exited the Australian and New Zealand market by selling its remaining 60% stake in Unisnack ANZ to Intersnack.

Products 
The company's food range comprises:

See also
 Huntley & Palmers
 List of food companies

Notes

References

External links

 

g
g
Snack food manufacturers of New Zealand
Food and drink companies based in Auckland
Manufacturing companies based in Auckland
Companies established in 1864
New Zealand brands
New Zealand subsidiaries of foreign companies
Food and drink companies established in 1864